The Eastside Historic Cemetery District is a historic district bounded by Elmwood Avenue, Mt. Elliott Avenue, Lafayette Street, and Waterloo Street in Detroit, Michigan. The district consists of three separate cemeteries: Mount Elliott Cemetery (Catholic, established 1841), Elmwood Cemetery (Protestant, established 1846), and the Lafayette Street Cemetery (Jewish, established 1850). The district was listed on the National Register of Historic Places in 1982.

Mount Elliott Cemetery

Mount Elliott Cemetery is the  oldest extant cemetery in the city of Detroit, and contains . It is located on Mount Elliott Avenue just north of Lafayette Street.

History
Detroit's Catholic community was originally heavily French in character. However, near the beginning of the 19th century, waves of immigration added other nationalities into the mix, notably Irish Catholics. In time, these Irish Catholics departed from the French-speaking Ste. Anne's and established their own parish. By 1840, they decided they wanted their own cemetery. In 1841, the parish purchased  of farmland from the Leib farm for $400.

The first burial in the cemetery occurred only twelve days after its establishment when Robert Elliott, an architect, judge, and founding member of the committee that created the cemetery, was laid to rest. He had been killed in a construction accident. The cemetery was christened "Mount Elliott" in his honor.

A second parcel of land was purchased for the cemetery in 1865, and a third in 1881; this brought the size of the cemetery to its current . A stone gateway into the cemetery was completed the same year. In 1869, remains from Detroit's Ste. Anne Cemetery were moved and re-interred at Mount Elliott. Among the remains moved was Colonel Jean François Hamtramck.

Description
Roads winding through the cemetery carry the names of religious leaders (Pope Pius Avenue, Bishop LeFevere Avenue and Place, and Bishop Borgess Avenue) or biblical themes (Calvary Avenue, Holy Cross Place, Trinity Avenue, and Resurrection Avenue).

The entrance to Mt. Elliott Cemetery is through a stone gateway designed and built by Walter Schweikart in 1882 at a cost of $6,000. Schweikart also built the entrance to the nearby Elmwood cemetery.

In 1872, Fireman's Fund bought large lots for $500 apiece in both Mt. Elliott and Elmwood Cemeteries for the purpose of burying firefighters. In 1889, the Fund erected a marker at the site for a cost of $2,965.

Gravesites
The following are some people buried in Mt. Elliott:
Orestes Brownson (1803–1876) Prolific Catholic writer
Jerome Cavanagh (1928–1979) Mayor of Detroit
Francis Palms (1809–1886), Lumber baron, Rail baron and Real estate tycoon, in family mausoleum

Elmwood Cemetery

It is located on Lafayette Street, just east of Mt. Elliott Avenue. It is the oldest continuously operating, non-denominational cemetery in Michigan.

History
Elmwood Cemetery was originally planned in 1846. The first  were purchased from the George Hunt farm using money from subscriptions in 1850. Over the years, additional land was purchased from the Hunt Farm and the neighboring D.C. Whitwood farm to increase the grounds to the current .

A Gothic Revival chapel, designed by Albert and Octavius Jordan, was added in 1856. The limestone chapel blends into the natural ravine and landscaping. Gordon W. Lloyd designed the Gothic-inspired gatehouse in 1870.

The 1856 chapel, which had fallen into disuse, was refurbished in the 1950s and is still used today. The chapel was extensively restored after a late 1900s fire.

Description
Elmwood Cemetery is one of the few places in modern Detroit where the "original" rolling terrain of the area can be seen. Parent Creek (renamed "Bloody Run" after the famous Indian battle) runs through the cemetery, serving as a focus of the landscape. Noted landscape designer Frederick Law Olmsted, inspired by the Mount Auburn Cemetery in Massachusetts, contributed to the redesign of the overall cemetery plan in 1891.

The cemetery is also famous for its multiple monuments, creating a city in miniature. These include works by noted sculptors, including the marble "Veiled Lady" by Randolph Rogers, and "Flying Geese" by Marshall Fredericks.

Gravesites
Twenty-nine Detroit mayors, at least six governors, eleven senators, and a dozen cabinet members are buried on the grounds. Those interred at Elmwood include:
Lewis Cass (1782–1866) Territorial governor, Senator, and Secretary of State
Douglass Houghton (1809–1845) Detroit mayor and explorer
Bernhard Stroh (1822–1882) Founder of the Stroh Brewery
Martha Jean Steinberg (1930–2000) Radio personality
Coleman Young (1918–1997) Detroit's first African-American mayor
Jacob Merritt Howard (1805–1871) U.S. Senator and writer of the 13th amendment
Margaret Mather (1859–1898) Canadian actress
Henry Billings Brown (1836-1913) U.S. Supreme Court Associate Justice
Edwin C. Denby (1879–1929) Secretary of the Navy
Zina Pitcher (1797–1872) Detroit mayor

Lafayette Street Cemetery
The Lafayette Street Cemetery, established by the Temple Beth El in 1850, is Michigan's oldest Jewish cemetery. It was originally named Champlain Street Cemetery of Temple Beth El because Lafayette was formerly known as Champlain Street.

History
The first burial was in 1851, and in 1854 Samuel Marcus, the first rabbi of Beth El, was buried in the cemetery. Although use slowed in the late 1880s, the cemetery was in active use until the 1950s. The cemetery is now part of the Elmwood Cemetery grounds.

References

Further reading
Cecile Wendt Jensen, Detroit's Mount Elliott Cemetery, Arcadia Publishing, 2006, 
Michael S. Franck, Elmwood Endures: History of a Detroit Cemetery, Wayne State University Press, 1996,

External links

Mt. Elliott Cemetery
Elmwood Cemetery

Historic districts in Detroit
Cemeteries on the National Register of Historic Places in Michigan
National Register of Historic Places in Detroit
Tourist attractions in Detroit
Historic districts on the National Register of Historic Places in Michigan